Bayard is an unincorporated community in Sussex County, Delaware, United States. Bayard is southwest of Bethany Beach.

History
Bayard's population was 50 in 1890, and was 52 in 1900.

References

Unincorporated communities in Sussex County, Delaware
Unincorporated communities in Delaware